Chorney is a surname. Notable people with the surname include:

Linda Chorney (born 1960), American singer-songwriter
Marc Chorney (born 1959), Canadian ice hockey player
Michael Chorney, American musician
Steven Chorney (born 1951), American artist, graphic designer and illustrator
Taylor Chorney (born 1987), Canadian-born American ice hockey player